is a Japanese manga series written and illustrated by Megumi Osuga. It has been serialized in Shogakukan's Monthly Shōnen Sunday since November 2016.

Publication
Matinee & Soiree is written and illustrated by Megumi Osuga. The series began in Shogakukan's Monthly Shōnen Sunday on November 11, 2016. In January 2021, it was announced that the manga entered its climax. Shogakukan has collected its chapters into individual tankobon volumes. The first volume was released on March 10, 2017. As of June 10, 2022, eleven volumes have been released.

The manga is licensed in Indonesia by Elex Media Komputindo.

Volume list

References

External links
 

Shogakukan manga
Shōnen manga